Mieczysław Karłowicz (born 8 September 1963) is a Polish former racing cyclist. He won the Tour de Pologne 1990.

References

External links

1963 births
Living people
Polish male cyclists
Sportspeople from Gdańsk